Hovden is a village in the municipality of Bykle in Agder county, Norway. It is located in the northern part of Setesdalen valley, on the Norwegian National Road 9 and the river Otra, on the eastern shore of the lake Hartevatnet. Fjellgardane Church is located in Hovden.

Tourism 

The Hovden area is a major winter tourism area since it is located in the Setesdalsheiene mountains and near many lakes such as Skyvatn, Holmavatnet, and Vatndalsvatnet.

Hovden has many leisure activities in the wintertime, especially skiing and ice fishing. There is a major downhill ski resort in Hovden as well as a water park and spa. In the summertime, tourists come to go hiking and fishing in the lakes. The Ørnefjell Golf Course in Hovden is a 9-hole golf course.  The area has Scandinavia's southernmost occurrence of wild reindeer.  In the autumn, Hovden is known for its abundance of bilberries, lingonberries, and cloudberries.

References

External links 
  Hovden
 Summer in Hovden
 Winter in Hovden
 

Ski areas and resorts in Norway
Villages in Agder
Setesdal